Lakabad-e Olya (also Romanized as Lakābād-e ‘Olyā; also known as Lakābād) is a village in Chahriq Rural District, Kuhsar District, Salmas County, West Azerbaijan Province, Iran. At the 2006 census, its population was 97, in 14 families.

References 

Populated places in Salmas County